is a former Japanese football player and manager.

Playing career
Ishii was born in Kanagawa Prefecture on May 26, 1959. After graduating from Nihon University, he joined Nissan Motors in 1982. In 1988, he moved to Otsuka Pharmaceutical.

Coaching career
In 1988, player Ishii also became an assistant coach at Otsuka Pharmaceutical. In 1993, he was promoted to manager. In 1997, he moved to Consadole Sapporo and became an assistant coach. In October 1998, manager Hugo Fernandez was sacked and Ishii was promoted to manager. In 2003, he moved to Vegalta Sendai. In September, he managed as caretaker.

Club statistics

Managerial statistics

References

1990-1991 JSL yearbook guide," Japan Football League, Church Nagumo, 1990 
1991-1992 JSL yearbook guide," Japan Football League, Church Nagumo, 1991 
J.League Official Guide 1998", Shogakukan Inc., 1998 
J.League Official Fans' Guide 1999, Trans Arts, 1999 
J.League Yearbook 1999", Trans Arts, 1999 
J.League Yearbook 2004", Konami Media Entertainment, 2004

External links

1959 births
Living people
Nihon University alumni
Association football people from Kanagawa Prefecture
Japanese footballers
Japan Soccer League players
Yokohama F. Marinos players
Tokushima Vortis players
Japanese football managers
J1 League managers
Hokkaido Consadole Sapporo managers
Vegalta Sendai managers
Expatriate football managers in China
Association football defenders